Ban Onglouang  is a village in Phouvong District of Attapeu Province of southeastern Laos.

References 

Populated places in Attapeu province
Phouvong District